Suchý (feminine: Suchá) is a Czech and Slovak surname meaning "dry". Notable persons with that name include:

Chuck Suchy, American musician and farmer
Dominik Suchý (born 1987), Czech bobsledder
Filip Suchý (born 1997), Czech ice hockey player
Jan Suchý (born 1944), Czech ice hockey player
Jaroslav Suchý (born 1971), Czech figure skater
Jessica Suchy-Pilalis (born 1954), American musician
Jiří Suchý (born 1931), Czech actor
Jiří Suchý (ice hockey) (born 1988), Czech ice hockey player
Marek Suchý (born 1988), Czech football player
Martin Suchý (born 1982), Slovak football defender
Martina Suchá (born 1980), Slovak tennis player
Radoslav Suchý (born 1976), Slovak ice hockey player
Růžena Suchá (1907–1989), Czech chess player

See also
 
Suchý, Czech village
Suchy, Swiss municipality
Suchy Las (disambiguation)

Czech-language surnames
Slovak-language surnames